Fisk Chapel (also known as A.M.E. Bethel Chapel) is a historic cruciform chapel on Cedar Avenue in Fair Haven, Monmouth County, New Jersey, United States.

It was built in 1882 in the Carpenter Gothic style for the town's African-American community and added to the National Register of Historic Places in 1975, upon the congregation's relocation to a newer building.

References

External links
 Official site

African Methodist Episcopal churches in New Jersey
Churches on the National Register of Historic Places in New Jersey
Churches in Monmouth County, New Jersey
Churches completed in 1882
19th-century Methodist church buildings in the United States
National Register of Historic Places in Monmouth County, New Jersey
New Jersey Register of Historic Places
Fair Haven, New Jersey